Anatoly Avgustovich Gunitsky (born September 30, 1953), also known as George and Old Rocker, is a Russian writer, journalist, and poet. He is one of the founders of Aquarium.

Since the foundation of Aquarium in 1972 he was the drummer of group and the author of many lyrics. In 1975 he left the group and participated in absurd theatre actions. In that period he wrote "Do samikh visot", "Smert bezbiletnika" and other plays.

Books

References 

Russian male poets
1953 births
Living people
Aquarium (band) members
Writers from Saint Petersburg